Zhang Hui (born 18 February 1997) is a Chinese footballer who currently plays for China League Two side Zhuhai Qin'ao.

Club career
Zhang Hui was promoted to China League One side Dalian Aerbin's (now known as Dalian Professional) first team squad in the 2015 season. On 12 April 2016, he made his senior debut after the club changed their name into Dalian Yifang in a 2016 Chinese FA Cup match against Baoding Yingli ETS. He scored the opener of the match, which ensured Dalian Yifang's 2–0 away win. On 4 September 2016, he made his league debut in a 3–1 away defeat to Beijing Renhe, coming on as a substitute for Shan Pengfei in the 81st minute.

In March 2017, Zhang was loaned to China League Two side Shaanxi Chang'an Athletic for the 2017 season. On 25 March 2017, he made his debut for the club in a 1–0 win against amateur club Heilongjiang Tianfeng. He scored his first and only goal of the season on 8 April 2017 in the season's opening match which Shaanxi beat Shenyang Dongjin 2–0.

Zhang returned to Dalian Yifang who newly promoted back to the Chinese Super League in 2018. On 24 April 2018, he made his return debut in a 4–1 away win over Liaoning in the 2018 Chinese FA Cup, coming on for Zhao Xuebin in the 62nd minute and scoring the fourth goal for Dalian in the 81st minute. On 2 May 2018, he played in another FA Cup match against Chongqing Dangdai Lifan with a 1–0 away win.

Zhang lost his position at Dalian Yifang in 2019 since Benitez's arrival. In 2021, he moved to Sichuan Minzu.

Career statistics
.

References

External links
 

1997 births
Living people
Chinese footballers
Footballers from Dalian
Dalian Professional F.C. players
Chinese Super League players
China League One players
Association football midfielders